"Dead & Bloated" is a song by American rock band Stone Temple Pilots that appears on their debut studio album Core. Despite never receiving a commercial single release outside a radio promo, the song was a favorite among the band's fans and saw frequent play during concerts.

Origin
Guitarist Dean DeLeo stated: "I was working at a guitar shop [LAB Sound] on the corner of Sunset and Gardner, and Scott was actually working catty-cornered across the street, driving models to their photo shoots. When either one of us had a musical idea, we'd call each other. He would usually have more time to run over and work it out. It was perfect because, since I was in a guitar shop, I could pick up a guitar right there. Scott didn't really play an instrument. When he had an idea, he would hum it to me. And 'Dead and Bloated,' was one of those things; he hummed that verse riff to me."

Song meaning
Vocalist Scott Weiland stated that "it's not really about anything. It's just stream-of-consciousness words. I mean, at the age of 21, 22, I didn't have a whole lot of life experiences. So it's more about the vibe, the angst and that kind of a thing, as opposed to actual life experiences."

Charts

References

1992 songs
1992 singles
Stone Temple Pilots songs
Songs written by Scott Weiland
Songs written by Robert DeLeo
Songs written by Dean DeLeo
Song recordings produced by Brendan O'Brien (record producer)
Atlantic Records singles